Rasmus Kristen Pettersen (8 September 1877 – 24 May 1957) was a Norwegian gymnast. He competed in the 1906 Summer Olympics, where he won a gold medal as part of the Norwegian gymnastics team.

External links
profile

1877 births
1957 deaths
Norwegian male artistic gymnasts
Gymnasts at the 1906 Intercalated Games

Medalists at the 1906 Intercalated Games